Margot Austin (September 18, 1907 – June 25, 1990) was an American children's book illustrator. She was born in Portland, Oregon and attended the National Academy of Design in New York. She illustrated many children's books and contributed to magazines including Jack and Jill Magazine.  Among her many books was a series about small animals in the church of Parson Pease-Porridge, beginning with E. P. Dutton's 1941 publication of Peter Churchmouse. Her book Gabriel Churchkitten was made into an animated film short in 1944. Ms. Austin died in 1990 at the age of 81 in her home in New Fairfield, Connecticut.

List of her works both as author and illustrator:
A Friend for Growl Bear	Illustrator
Archie Angel	Dutton 1957	Author & Illustrator
Barney's Adventure	E. P. Dutton 1941	
Brave John Henry	Dutton 1955	Author & Illustrator
Churchkitten Stories	Author & Illustrator
Churchmouse Stories		Author & Illustrator
Cousin's Treasure	    Dutton 1960	Author & Illustrator
David’s Silver Dollar	The Platt & Munk co. 1940	Illustrator
Effelli	E. P. Dutton 1942	Author & Illustrator
First Prize for Danny	Dutton, 1952	Author & Illustrator
Gabriel Churchkitten	E.P. Dutton and Company 1942	Author & Illustrator
Gabriel Churchkitten and the Moths	E.P. Dutton, 1948	Author & Illustrator
Growl Bear	Dutton 1951	Author & Illustrator
Lutie	E.P. Dutton & Company 1944	Author & Illustrator
Manuel’s Kite String, and other Stories	Charles Scribner's Sons 1943	Author & Illustrator
Mother Goose Rhymes	The Platt & Munk Co 1940	Illustrator
Moxie & Hanty & Bunty	Charles Scribner's Sons 1939	Author & Illustrator
My Brimful Book	Platt & Monk Co 1960	Illustrator
Once Upon a Springtime	Charles Scribner's Sons 1940	Author
Peter Churchmouse	E.P. Dutton 1941	Author & Illustrator
Poppet	E.P. Dutton 1949	Author & Illustrator
The Springs of Joy	Rand Mc Nally	Illustrator
The Three Silly Kittens'''	Dutton 1950	Author & IllustratorThe Very Young Mother Goose	New York, Platt & Munk 1963	IllustratorTrumpet	E.P. Dutton 1943	Author & IllustratorTumble Bear	Charles Scribner's Sons 1940	AuthorWillamette Way	Charles Scribner's Sons, 1941	AuthorWilliam's Shadow''	Dutton 1954	Author & Illustrator

References

American children's book illustrators
Artists from Portland, Oregon
1990 deaths
Artists from Connecticut
1907 births
American women illustrators
20th-century American women artists
People from New Fairfield, Connecticut